Takeshi Nakano (中野 剛志, Takeshi Nakano, born October 25, 1971) is a Japanese bureaucrat, conservative critic and scholar of economic thought and political thought. Together with Satoshi Fujii, he is the one who introduced Modern Monetary Theory (MMT) to Japan.

Biography 
Nakano was born in Kanagawa Prefecture, Japan. He was educated at Kougyokusha. He received a bachelor's degree in International Relations from University of Tokyo and studied at the "Hyogensha Jyuku", an private school founded by Susumu Nishibe. He got a M.Sc. with distinction and a Ph.D. in Politics from University of Edinburgh, Scotland. 

He was an associate professor at Satoshi Fujii's lab, Kyoto University and a consulting fellow at RIETI (The Research Institute of Economy, Trade and Industry), Ministry of Economy, Trade and Industry. 

He is currently serving as a director of Consumption and Distribution Policy Division, Commerce and Information Policy Bureau, Ministry of Economy, Trade and Industry.

References

See also 

 Susumu Nishibe
 Satoshi Fujii
 Economic Nationalism

University of Tokyo alumni
Academic staff of Kyoto University
Alumni of the University of Edinburgh
1971 births
Living people